Ilias Makryonitis (born 10 April 1989) is a Greek professional footballer who plays as a goalkeeper.

Career 

He is a product of the AEK Athens youth ranks. He advanced to the first team on 20 August 2012, signing for four years, as the 4th goalkeeper, behind Konstantopoulos, Arabatzis and Moschonas. He then became the 3rd goalkeeper, moving ahead of Moschonas. Before he signed with AEK, he played for Proodeftiki, Vyzas and PAO Rouf, but he played in only 6 games - one for Proodeftiki in the 2006-2007 season, one for PAO Rouf in 2010-2011, and four in the next season.

References
 Επιβεβαίωση με Μακρυωνίτη στο Ηράκλειο‚ stoplekto.gr, 14 January 2016

External links 
 
 Profile at soccerfame.gr - to Greek
 Profile and statistics at myplayer.gr (Greek)
 

1989 births
Living people
Association football goalkeepers
Super League Greece players
Proodeftiki F.C. players
Vyzas F.C. players
AEK Athens F.C. players
Ionikos F.C. players
Panelefsiniakos F.C. players
Footballers from Athens
Greek footballers